"The Girl Is Mine" is a song by British electronic music duo 99 Souls. A mash-up of Destiny's Child's "Girl" (2004) and Brandy and Monica's "The Boy Is Mine" (1998), the funky house track was released on 6 November 2015 with a re-recorded vocal from Brandy. The song peaked at number five on the UK Singles Chart.

Background
The song was first released in December 2014, appearing on SoundCloud. While creators 99 Souls thought not much would come of it, the mash-up garnered 2.9 million streams within its first year of release. However, it was later taken down due to copyright violations.

After the approval of both Brandy and Beyoncé, the song was released commercially in November 2015. The song was enhanced with a re-recorded vocal from Brandy, along with additional changes. Though Brandy agreed to record new vocals for the mash-up track, Monica turned the offer down, commenting. "I feel like sometimes things that are a part of history and that are in history should be left as such so that it can be upheld with the respect that it was given even back then," she told The Huffington Post. "That's the one song and the one time that [Brandy and I] both won a Grammy and experienced certain things. So I have a lot of memories and emotions connected to that record."

Music video
A music video for "The Girl Is Mine" was released on 99 Souls' Vevo account on 20 November 2015, and was directed by Sandl.

Charts and certifications

Weekly charts

Year-end charts

Certifications

See also
 List of number-one dance singles of 2016 (U.S.)

References

External links
99SoulsOfficial – official website
 

2015 songs
2015 debut singles
Brandy Norwood songs
Destiny's Child songs
Songs written by Rodney Jerkins
Songs written by Fred Jerkins III
Songs written by Beyoncé
Songs written by LaShawn Daniels
Songs written by Brandy Norwood
Songs written by Kelly Rowland
Songs written by Michelle Williams (singer)
Mashup songs
Songs written by 9th Wonder